UFC 60: Hughes vs. Gracie was a mixed martial arts event held by the Ultimate Fighting Championship on May 27, 2006. The event took place at the Staples Center, in Los Angeles, California and was broadcast live on pay-per-view in the United States and Canada.

Background
Headlining the card was a non-title catchweight (175 lb) match between then-current UFC Welterweight Champion Matt Hughes, and UFC Hall of Famer Royce Gracie, the winner of UFC 1, UFC 2 and UFC 4. This was Gracie's first match in the UFC and in the United States since UFC 5.

The event drew 620,000  buys, becoming the best-selling pay-per-view in UFC history up to that point, and the first to break the $20 million mark in gross PPV sales.

Results

Reported Payout

Royce Gracie: $400,000

Matt Hughes: $110,000

Jeremy Horn: $70,000

Brandon Vera: $32,000

Diego Sanchez: $24,000

Mike Swick: $14,000

Spencer Fisher: $14,000

Joe Riggs: $12,000

Gabriel Gonzaga: $10,000 

Melvin Guillard: $10,000

Alessio Sakara: $10,000

Dean Lister: $10,000

Assuerio Silva: $8,000

Chael Sonnen: $5,000

Fabiano Scherner: $3,000

Matt Wiman: $3,000

John Alessio: $3,000

Rick Davis: $2,000

Disclosed Fighter Payroll: $740,000

See also
 Ultimate Fighting Championship
 List of UFC champions
 List of UFC events
 2006 in UFC

References

External links
Official UFC 60 site
Passing of the Guard: Hughes Dominates Gracie
UFC 60: Hughes vs. Gracie Results from ufc.com

Ultimate Fighting Championship events
2006 in mixed martial arts
Mixed martial arts in Los Angeles
2006 in sports in California